Félix or Felice Baciocchi may refer to:
Felice Pasquale Baciocchi (1762–1841), Corsican brother-in-law of Napoleon I Prince of Piombino and Lucca
Félix Baciocchi (1803–1866), nephew of the above, chamberlain of Napoleon III then senator